Geszt is a village in Békés County, in the Southern Great Plain region of south-east Hungary.

The name of the village appeared first in a written document in 1213.

Kálmán Tisza, the Prime Minister of Hungary between 1875 and 1890, was born here.

Geography
It covers an area of 51.42 km² and has a population of 821 people (2015).

References

Populated places in Békés County